Arattupuzha Pooram is an Indian temple festival held at the Arattupuzha Temple in Arattupuzha, Thrissur district of Kerala. Visitors from nearby and far off places reach the village of Arattupuzha during the festival days. The pinnacle of the seven-day festival is the last two days. The evening prior to the last day of the festival would have an assembly of caparisoned elephants and staging of percussion ensembles as part of the ceremony called Sasthavinte Melam. The pancharimelam of Aarttupuzha Sasthavu is the largest assembly of percussion artists in any other night Poorams. More than 200 artists perform in sasthavinte melam. This can only be seen at Sree Poornathrayeesa Temple, Tripunithura other than in Arattupuzha Pooram 

The Pooram is known as Devamela as it is a conglomeration of gods, given its massive attendance of deities from neighbourhood shrines. A total of 23 deities of various temples from different parts of Thrissur District attend the Pooram and is considered as the oldest temple festival in the Indian subcontinent. Important deities that participate in the Arattupuzha Pooram are Oorakathu Amma Thiruvadi Cherpu Bhagavathy Triprayar Thevar.

References

http://www.arattupuzhasreesasthatemple.com/pages/home.html

Festivals in Thrissur district
March observances
April observances
Elephant festivals in Kerala
Hindu festivals in Kerala